Williams v Bayley (1866) LR 1 HL 200 is an English contract law case relating to undue influence.

Facts
Mr Bayley’s son forged his father’s signature on promissory notes and gave them to Mr Williams. Mr Williams threatened Mr Bayley that he would bring criminal prosecution against his son unless he granted an equitable mortgage to get back the notes.

Judgment
House of Lords upheld the cancellation of the agreement, on account of undue influence. The agreement was cancelled on the ground that he was influenced by threat.

See also

English contract law
Iniquitous pressure in English law
Lloyds Bank Ltd v Bundy [1975] QB 326
Williams v. Walker-Thomas Furniture Co. 350 F.2d 445 (C.A. D.C. 1965)

Notes

References

English unconscionability case law
House of Lords cases
1866 in case law
1866 in British law